Augustus Aiken (July 26, 1902 in Charleston, South Carolina – April 1, 1973 in New York City) was an early jazz trumpeter who also did blues. He started with the Jenkins Orphanage band.

He was first recorded professionally in 1919. In the 1920s he worked with several groups, but his best known work would be with Louis Armstrong. He went on to play with Sid Catlett, Roy Eldridge, and Elmer Snowden before his career declined. The end of the Big Band era and the rise of rock and roll is seen as causing the decline.

His name is often incorrectly spelled as "Gus Aitken".

Web sources

External links
Jazz database (In French)
 Gus Aiken recordings at the Discography of American Historical Recordings.

American jazz trumpeters
American male trumpeters
1973 deaths
1902 births
20th-century American musicians
20th-century trumpeters
20th-century American male musicians
American male jazz musicians